The Zephyrhills Downtown Historic District is a historic district in Zephyrhills, Florida. On September 27, 2001, it was added to the U.S. National Register of Historic Places. The district includes the Capt. Harold B. Jeffries House which was built in 1911 and was the home of city founder, Capt. Jeffries.

It is a residential and commercial area.

It includes the Zephyrhills Woman's Club, which houses the local women's civic organization founded in early days of the town.  It was built as part of Works Project Administration projects in the 1930s.

It includes the City Hall, also built as a WPA project, built in Art Deco style in 1940.  It has a Mission-inspired parapet and corner battlements.

Gallery

References

External links

Geography of Pasco County, Florida
Historic districts on the National Register of Historic Places in Florida
National Register of Historic Places in Pasco County, Florida
Women's clubs in Florida